Yoon Yong-Il (born September 23, 1973 in Daegu, South Korea) is a former professional South Korean tennis player.  

Yoon reached his highest individual ranking on the ATP Tour on December 18, 2000, when he became World number 140.  He played primarily on the Futures circuit and the Challenger circuit.

Yoon was a member of the South Korean Davis Cup team, posting a 16–10 record in singles and a 3–4 record in doubles in sixteen ties played.

Tour singles titles – all levels (7–10)

External links

1973 births
Living people
South Korean male tennis players
Tennis players at the 1996 Summer Olympics
Tennis players at the 2000 Summer Olympics
Asian Games medalists in tennis
Tennis players at the 1994 Asian Games
Tennis players at the 1998 Asian Games
Tennis players at the 2002 Asian Games
Asian Games gold medalists for South Korea
Asian Games silver medalists for South Korea
Sportspeople from Daegu
Medalists at the 1994 Asian Games
Medalists at the 1998 Asian Games
Medalists at the 2002 Asian Games
Universiade medalists in tennis
Universiade gold medalists for South Korea
Olympic tennis players of South Korea
Medalists at the 1995 Summer Universiade
Medalists at the 1997 Summer Universiade
20th-century South Korean people